Steven C. Ames   (born March 15, 1988) is an American former professional baseball relief pitcher.

Career

Los Angeles Dodgers
Ames was drafted by the Los Angeles Dodgers in the 17th round of the 2009 MLB Draft out of Gonzaga University. He began his career with the Ogden Raptors in 2009, with a 2.10 ERA in 17 appearances. In 2010 with the Great Lakes Loons of the Midwest League he had a 2.54 ERA in 23 games with 16 saves. In 2011, he split the year between the Rancho Cucamonga Quakes of the California League (1.17 in 15 games, 9 saves) and the Chattanooga Lookouts of the Southern League (2.48 in 28 games, 5 saves).

Ames spent the 2012 season with the Lookouts, where he appeared in 54 games and had a 1.56 ERA and 18 saves. He was also selected to the Southern League Mid-Season All-Star team. The Dodgers added him to the 40 man roster after the season and promoted him to the AAA Albuquerque Isotopes to start the 2013 season.

Miami Marlins
On July 6, 2013, he was traded to the Miami Marlins (along with Josh Wall and Ángel Sánchez) for Ricky Nolasco. He began with the New Orleans Zephyrs and was promoted to the Majors for the first time on July 28. He made four appearances for the Marlins that season over a two-week span, posting a 4.50 ERA and 4 Ks while earning one loss.

Ames was outrighted off the 40 man roster on October 4, 2013, and spent the entirety of the 2014 season pitching through the Marlins minor league chain. Over 5 starts with the Gulf Coast Marlins and 9 appearances each with the AA Jacksonville Suns and AAA New Orleans Zephyrs, he went 3–3 with a 3.56 ERA and 1.29 WHIP.

The Marlins released Ames on April 2, 2015.

Bridgeport Bluefish

Ames signed with the Bridgeport Bluefish of the independent Atlantic League of Professional Baseball for the 2015 season. In 33 games, Ames was 1–2 with a 4.45 ERA and 28 Ks in  innings pitched.

References

External links

1988 births
Living people
Miami Marlins players
Ogden Raptors players
Arizona League Dodgers players
Great Lakes Loons players
Rancho Cucamonga Quakes players
Chattanooga Lookouts players
Albuquerque Isotopes players
New Orleans Zephyrs players
Gonzaga Bulldogs baseball players
Major League Baseball pitchers
Gulf Coast Marlins players
Bridgeport Bluefish players
Sportspeople from Vancouver, Washington